Rosine Streeter is a trade unionist from New Caledonia.

Early life
Streeter was born on the island of Lifou.

Career
In 1979, she was appointed General Secretary of Union des Syndicats des Ouvriers et Employés de Nouvelle-Calédonie (USOENC), a trade union for workers and employees. In 1995, after 16 years in the position, she left to start her own trade union (Syndicat Libre Unité Action – SLUA).

Streeter has been a member of the Economic and Social Council of New Caledonia and chaired the Committee on Health and Welfare.

References

Living people
Women trade unionists
New Caledonian women in politics
Year of birth missing (living people)